Istiqlal Mosque may refer to:

 Istiqlal Mosque, Sarajevo in Otoka, Sarajevo, Bosnia and Herzegovina
 Istiqlal Mosque, Jakarta in Jakarta, Indonesia